Rooqma Ray, also known as Rukma Roy, is an Indian Bengali television actress who works primarily in TV soap operas. She is well known for playing the lead characters of Rajkumari Kiranmala in Kiranmala and Mampi in Desher Maati. She has also played both supporting and lead roles in many soap operas and web series.

Filmography

Films
Gopone Mod Chharan (2023)

Television

Web series
Rahasya Romancha Season 3 (2020) on Hoichoi
Byomkesh Season 6 (2021) on Hoichoi
Roktokorobi (Web Series)  (2023) on ZEE5

References

External links 
 

Living people
Actresses from Kolkata
Bengali television actresses
21st-century Indian actresses
Bengali actresses
Indian web series actresses
Actresses in Bengali television
Actresses in Bengali cinema
1995 births